High Year Tenure (HYT) is a term used by the United States Armed Forces to describe the maximum number of years enlisted members may serve at a given rank without achieving promotion, after which they must separate or retire. HYT is applicable to enlisted of all six military branches of the United States.

Officers are not subject to HYT, but are instead limited to statutory service limits by pay grade. See Defense Officer Personnel Management Act for officer information.

In the United States Army, soldiers will finish their enlistment contract if they exceed HYT or RCP (retention control point),unless they are reduced in rank.

History
On 1 August 2017, the Navy extended the HYT for active component sailors to 10 years from 8 years for third class petty officers, to 16 years from 14 years for second class petty officers, and to 22 years from 20 years for first class petty officers.

On 14 December 2017, the Navy announced that it will extend the HYT for seamen from its current five to six years on 1 February 2018.

On 1 February 2019, the Air Force increased the HYT for E-4 through E-6.

On 3 October 2022, the Coast Guard suspended HYT for enlisted active duty members until 1 January 2025.

On 22 December 2022, the Navy suspended HYT until 30 September 2024.

HYT dates
Extensions to the HYT date can be obtained for various reasons such as personal hardships or base closures. HYT dates vary by rank/rate, as follows:

See also
Up or out, a similar private-sector concept

References

Uniformed services of the United States